Al Fahidi Historical Neighbourhood (also known as Al Bastakiya) is a historic district in Dubai, United Arab Emirates (UAE).

The construction of Al Fahidi Historical Neighbourhood dates back to the 1890s. In its prime, the locality was capable of 60 housing units, most of which were separated by narrow, winding lanes. The town of Al Bastakiya was primarily built by the affluent Persian Merchants drawn to Dubai by the rich trade opportunities and incentives offered by the Emirati government, the district was named after the southern Iranian town of Bastak.  

In the 1980s half of the Al Fahidi Historical Neighbourhood village was destroyed to make way for the development of a new office complex. The remaining houses were mostly used as warehouses or accommodation for foreign laborers. In 1989, the Dubai Municipality directed that the remaining parts of Al Fahidi Historical Neighbourhood were to be demolished. Rayner Otter, a British architect, came to the area and made extensive renovation in the house where he was staying. Rayner started a campaign to preserve the area and wrote a letter to Prince Charles, who was scheduled to visit Dubai that year. On his arrival, Prince Charles asked to visit Al Fahidi Historical Neighborhood and explored the whole area with Rayner Otter. During his visit the Prince suggested that Al Fahidi Historical Neighbourhood should be preserved and the demolition was canceled.

In 2005, a project was initiated by the Dubai Municipality to restore the localities of old buildings and lanes.

Places in Al Bastakiya 
Al Bastakiya consist of several places which includes:

Mawaheb Gallery 
Mawaheb meaning in Arabic is an art studio. The Dubai Based Art Studio is from beautiful people for adults with special needs. The studio is for the determined ones and above age or equal to age of 16. Mawaheb provides an opportunity to develop life skills through art, while demonstrating that everyone can be creative in their own unique way.

Arabian Tea House Café 
The café is designed keeping in view the old heritage of Dubai people. It present the traditional Arabic food.

XVA Gallery 
Established in 2003, XVA Gallery is one of the leading galleries in the Middle East that specialise in contemporary art from the Arab world, Iran and the Subcontinent. Our exhibitions focus on works by the region's foremost artists as well as those emerging onto the scene. The gallery's artists express their different cultural identities and perspectives, challenging the viewer to let go of any prejudice or preconception in order to fully appreciate the subject. Also features an Art Hotel and Cafe, serving Middle Eastern vegetarian food.

Sheikh Muhammad Center for Cultural Understanding 
It is a non-profit organization. The purpose of creating this organization was to establish a relationship of culture between the people of Dubai.

Coffee Museum 
This unique idea of Coffee from around the world to bring at one place is also a part of Al Bastakiya. The Museum consist of two floors. On ground floor shop where coffee lovers can buy of their choice. Different roasting and brewing style are demonstrated live on this floor. On the second floor there are history books area relates to coffee.

Alserkal Cultural Foundation 
A platform supporting emerging artists, designers and creative minds based in the UAE. ACF holds a vibrant environment featuring 5 exhibition rooms, Creativity Corner – souvenir spot, Fashion Corner – a collection of contemporary clothing linking Arab with the modern age, Book Quarter – rare and hard-to-find books related to the region's art, culture, religion and Emirati history, Home Corner – a shop dedicated to home décor and lifestyle. ACF also hosts at the rooftop, events and cultural programmes with a fully equipped workshop room managed in partnership with Make Art Café, which also serves gourmet food and refreshing beverages at the courtyard.

Make Art Café 
This art café is opened in November 2015, the MAKE Art Café runs its operations from the courtyard of a charming heritage villa in one of the most attractive heritage areas in the UAE.

References 
 Bastakiya Village  The attractions of Dubai: Bastakiya Village

External links 

Communities in Dubai
Architecture in the United Arab Emirates